Gonçalo Alexandre Glórias Tavares (born 16 May 1997) is a Portuguese professional footballer who plays in Spain for Recreativo Granada on loan from Belenenses SAD as a defender.

Club career
On 28 December 2018, Tavares made his professional debut with Belenenses in a 2018–19 Taça da Liga match against 
Porto.

On 2 September 2019 he joined Spanish club Recreativo Granada on a season-long loan with option to purchase.

References

External links

1997 births
Living people
People from Odivelas
Portuguese footballers
Association football defenders
Real S.C. players
Clube Oriental de Lisboa players
C.F. Os Belenenses players
Belenenses SAD players
Club Recreativo Granada players
Primeira Liga players
Segunda División B players
Portuguese expatriate footballers
Expatriate footballers in Spain
Sportspeople from Lisbon District